Brandon K. Ross is an American jazz guitarist. He was born in New Brunswick, New Jersey.

Career
Ross did clerical work for Leroy Jenkins before playing with Archie Shepp and Marion Brown in the second half of the 1970s.

He has performed with Wadada Leo Smith, Gene Lake, Marcus Rojas, John Lurie, Henry Threadgill, Don Byron, and Cassandra Wilson.

In 1998, Ross, bassist Melvin Gibbs, and drummer J.T. Lewis formed the trio Harriet Tubman, which continues to perform concerts and record, as of 2020.

Discography

As leader
 Costume (Intoxicate, 2004)
 Puppet (Intoxicate, 2006)
 For Living Lovers (Sunnyside, 2014)

As sideman
With Kip Hanrahan
 A Thousand Nights and a Night (1-Red Night) (American Clave, 1996)
 A Thousand Nights and a Night (Shadow Night 1) (Justin Time, 1998)
 Beautiful Scars (American Clave, 2007)
 Crescent Moon Waning (Yellowbird, 2018)

With Oliver Lake
 Plug It (Gramavision, 1983)
 Dancevision (Blue Heron, 1986)
 Impala (Gramavision, 1987)

With Meshell Ndegeocello
 The Spirt Music Jamia (Universal, 2005)
 The Article 3 (Bismallah, 2006)
 The World Has Made Me the Man of My Dreams (Bismallah, 2007)

With Wadada Leo Smith
 Spiritual Dimensions (Cuneiform, 2009)
 Heart's Reflections (Cuneiform, 2011)
 Najwa (TUM, 2017)

With Henry Threadgill
 Spirit of Nuff...Nuff (Black Saint, 1991)
 Too Much Sugar for a Dime (Axiom, 1993)
 Song Out of My Trees (Black Saint, 1994)
 Carry the Day (Columbia, 1995)
 Making a Move (Columbia, 1995)
 Where's Your Cup? (Columbia, 1997)
 Everybody's Mouth's a Book (Pi, 2001)

With Cassandra Wilson
 Blue Light Till Dawn (Blue Note, 1993)
 New Moon Daughter (Blue Note, 1995)
 Glamoured (Blue Note, 2003)
 Closer to You (Blue Note, 2009)
 Silver Pony (Blue Note, 2010)

With others
 Pheeroan akLaff, Fits Like a Glove (Gramavision, 1983)
 Arrested Development, Unplugged (Chrysalis, 1993)
 Marion Brown, La Placita (Timeless Muse, 1979)
 Marion Brown, Five Improvisations (B.Free, 2014)
 Don Byron, Plays the Music of Mickey Katz (Elektra Nonesuch, 1993)
 Don Byron, Love, Peace, and Soul (Savoy, 2012)
 Alana Davis, Blame It on Me (Elektra, 1997)
 DJ Logic, Project Logic (Ropeadope, 1999)
 Fred Hopkins, Prophecy (About Time, 1990)
 Graham Haynes, Transition (Antilles, 1995)
 Graham Haynes, BPM (Knitting Factory, 2000)
 Leroy Jenkins, Leroy Jenkins Live! (Black Saint, 1993)
 Leroy Jenkins, Urban Blues (Black Saint, 1984)
 Bill Laswell, Jazzonia (Douglas Music, 1998)
 Bill Laswell, Moody's Mood for Love (Douglas, 1998)
 Myra Melford, The Image of Your Body (Cryptogramophone, 2006)
 Myra Melford, The Whole Tree Gone (Firehouse 12, 2010)
 Ron Miles, Laughing Barrel (Sterling Circle, 2003)
 Butch Morris, Current Trends in Racism in Modern America (Sound Aspects, 1985)
 Ivo Perelman, Children of Ibeji (Enja, 1992)
 Julian Schnabel, Every Silver Lining Has a Cloud (Island, 1995)
 Archie Shepp, There's a Trumpet in My Soul (Arista/Freedom, 1975)
 Archie Shepp, Attica Blues Big Band Live at the Palais Des Glaces (Blue Marge, 1979)

References

External links
 Brandon Ross's MySpace page
 2007 interview with David Garland of WYNC radio

Year of birth missing (living people)
Living people
American jazz guitarists
Place of birth missing (living people)
Sunnyside Records artists